Katsuhito Kumagai (born 3 October 1964) is a Japanese alpine skier. He competed in four events at the 1988 Winter Olympics.

References

1964 births
Living people
Japanese male alpine skiers
Olympic alpine skiers of Japan
Alpine skiers at the 1988 Winter Olympics
Sportspeople from Aomori Prefecture